Allah Hoo (Allah hu) is a traditional Sufi chant (dhikr) consisting of the word for God run together three times, followed by Truth (haqq): Allāhu Allāhu Allāhu Haqq, itself repeated three times over. According to Sufi tradition, this formula was introduced by Abu Bakr as he initiated the Naqshbandi tradition (Kabbani 2003 p. 87). Other Dhikrs consist of simple Allāhu Allāhu run together 400 or 600 times.

"Allah Hoo" is also a popular title for Urdu-language Sufi devotional qawwalis.

Etymology
The "Hoo" is due to the nominative suffix (i`rab) -u (ḍamma) being pronounced before initial vowel, as the word Allahu is run together several times: Allahu Allahu Allahu is rendered as /al:a:hual:a:hual:a:h/ (compare the phrase Allahu Akbar where the -u is also audible). In traditional Sufi chant, the length of the -u is exaggerated. As a noun phrase, the chant is interpreted as meaning "God is". Haqq is the Arabic for "truth", so that the full dhikr translates to  "God is. God is. God is Truth."the naat starts of like this Allahu diya paiyan pukaran aqa aye ayan bharan

Qawwali
Qawwalis titled "Allah Hoo" have been performed by many different qawwals.  Although these songs have the same title, many of them are totally different songs.  For example, the "Allah Hoo" that appears on the Sabri Brothers 1998 CD Qawwali: Sufi Music from Pakistan is totally different from the song that became one of Nusrat Fateh Ali Khan's signature qawwalis, and this in turn is totally different from Qawwal Bahauddin's version on the 1991 Shalimar compilation video titled "Tajdar-e-Haram, vol. 2" (although all three songs do have some lyrics in common).  Versions of the song have also been sung by many other qawwals and Sufi singers, including Hans Raj Hans, Master Salim, Faiz Ali Faiz, and the Nooran Sisters. Versions of the song have been translated into other languages. An English version is sung by Sami Yusuf on the album Al-Muʽallim (2003), while a Malay version is sung by a popular Malaysian Nasheed group Raihan.

It is also a song by Sufi rock musician Salman Ahmad, formerly of Junoon, the Pakistani rock band.

In 1st season of Coke Studio (Pakistan), "Allah Hu" was sung by Ali Zafar along with Saaein Tufail Ahmed in 2008.

In 2nd season of Coke Studio (India), "Allah Hu" was sung by Nooran Sisters composed by Hitesh Sonik in 2012.

"Allah Hu" in its basic naat form was penned by the late Maulana Syed Hasan Imdad of Pakistan.

See also

Hu (Sufism)

References

Muhammad Hisham Kabbani, Classical Islam and the Naqshbandi Sufi Tradition (2003)
 Josef Kuckertz, Was ist indische Musik?, Archiv für Musikwissenschaft (1996), p. 99.
Charles Wolverton,  'Ballyhoo' , American Speech (1935), 289-291.

External links
Nusrat Fateh Ali Khan lyrics
Sami Yusuf lyrics

Sufism
Naqshbandi order
Nusrat Fateh Ali Khan songs
Junoon (band) songs